The history of Galatasaray S.K. covers over 100 years of the sports from the club based in Istanbul, Turkey. Established in 1905, the club became the most successful club in the history of Turkish football.

First steps and foundation
After being influenced by the French Lycée model, the Galatasaray High School became much more of a modern school in September 1868. French was the main language for instructing, and many teachers were European. The students included members of all religious and ethnic communities from the Ottoman Empire.
The school introduced sports (mainly gymnastics) as a new school subject and Monsieur Curel was the first gymnastics teacher.
In 1899, a "football" first came to Galatasaray High School, but the pupils just kicked the ball at the Grand Cour of the school.
In autumn 1902 Ali Sami Yen visited his uncle Suphi in Moda and on his way to him he saw Englishmen playing football at Moda field. 
He told his friends of this new sport, and on October 14, 1905 (which corresponds to "1 Teşrinievvel 1321" according to the Islamic Rumi calendar (hence the common error of giving the date as "1 October 1905" by ignoring the 13 days of difference between the Rumi calendar and Gregorian calendar before the Ottoman calendar adjustment reforms of 1917–1918), during the History and Literature lesson of teacher Mehmet Ata Bey, they founded the club in the back rows of the classroom Literature 5B.

In addition to Ali Sami Yen (Club member No. 1), who was the driving force behind the club's foundation, Asim Tevfik Sonumut (2), Emin Bülent Serdaroğlu (3), Celal Ibrahim (4), Boris Nikolov (5), Milo Bakić (6), Pavle Bakić (7), Bekir Sitki Bircan (8), Tahsin Nihat (9), Reşat Şirvanizade (10), Hüseyin Hüsnü (11), Refik Cevdet Kalpakçıoğlu (12) and Abidin Daver (13)  were also involved in the decision to organize such a club. 
Their first match was against Kadıköy Faure School and they won this match 2–0. There were discussions about the club's name, in which some suggested Gloria (victory) and others Audace (courage), but it was decided that its name would be Galatasaray.

According to researcher Cem Atabeyoğlu, Galatasaray took its name from one of its first matches. In that match, Galatasaray won 2–0 over Rûm club and the spectators called them "Galata Sarayı efendileri" (in English: Gentlemen of Galata Palace), and, after this event, they adopted that name and started to call their club "Galata Sarayı". In 1905, during the era of the Ottoman Empire, there were no laws for associations so the club could not be registered officially, but, after the 1912 Law of Association, the club registered legally.

This was how the first Turkish football club was founded. Among with the founder Ali Sami Yen, the co-founders were the ones who were keen to do this sport, such as Asim Tevfik Sonumut, Reşat Şirvani, Cevdet Kalpakçıoğlu, Abidin Daver and Kamil.

At first, the colours of Galatasaray were red and white. These are the colours in the modern Turkish flag. The Turkish Republic, however, was not founded at that time. Therefore, this decision caused the repressive administration of the day to feel uncomfortable and the administration subsequently pressured the footballers. For this reason, on December 26, 1906 the colors were changed to yellow and black,. The eight-piece halved design kit was ordered from the Sports Outfitter William Shillcock based in Birmingham, United Kingdom. After a heavy 0–5 loss to Baltalimanı in a friendly match the new colours yellow and black were counted as inauspicious.

On December 6, 1908 new colors were chosen as red and yellow. Ali Sami Yen stated, "After we have been in and out of several shops, we saw two different elegant-looking wool materials in Fatty Yanko's store at Bahçekapısı (between Eminönü and Sirkeci in Istanbul, now called Bahçekapı). One of them was quite dark red, resembling the cherry color, and the other a rich yellow with a touch of orange. When the sales clerk made the two fabrics fly together with a twist of his hand they became so bright that it reminded us the beauty of a goldfinch. We thought we were looking at the colors flickering in burning fire. We were picturing the yellow-red flames shining on our team and dreaming that it would take us to victories. Indeed it did."

Pre-professional period

Ali Sami Yen Era
Ali Sami Yen is the founder of the club, and the first president of club that served until the 1920s. Since the Turkish republic founded in 1923, Ali Sami Yen did a great job, both founding and developing the first Turkish football club and protecting it against the strict rules of the former state of command in Istanbul, the Ottoman Empire.

Between 1905 and 1906 Galatasaray just played friendly matches. Since there were not any Turkish teams, Galatasaray joined the Istanbul Football League that was consisting of English and Greek teams in the season of 1906–1907.
In its first season, in the Istanbul Football League Galatasaray finished 4th.
The next season the club finished 3rd in the Istanbul Football League.
With their first championship title, which was won in 1908–1909, they heralded the beginning of Turkish football history.

The First Dynasty (1908–1916)

In 1908 Galatasaray SK signed Horace Armitage, who had already won the league twice with Cadi Keuy FRC, as a player and as manager and the first dynasty of Galatasaray and Turkish football begun. 
The club won three consecutive Istanbul Football League championships in 1909, 1910 and 1911.

Although Armitage left the club in 1911, the club went on to win the league in 1915 and 1916.

Ali Sami Yen, the founder of Galatasaray Sports Club, was also the first League President of "Turkiye Futbol Birligi (1911).

On Sunday 17 January 1909 the first Kıtalar Arası Derbi was played. The game, staged at Papazın Çayırı where Şükrü Saracoğlu Stadium is located today, finished 2–0 to Galatasaray SK. Emin Bülent Serdaroğlu scored the first goal of the Kıtalar Arası Derbi. The second goal was scored by Galatasaray SK Left-Wingback Celal İbrahim.
On February 12, 1911 Galatasaray SK achieved their biggest Kıtalar Arası Derbi win. Beating Fenerbahçe SK 7–0 with only 7 players on the pitch. 4 goals were scored by Celal İbrahim, 2 by Emin Bülent Serdaroğlu and 1 goal was scored by Idris.
Galatasaray SK won the first eight Kıtalar Arası Derbi matches, scoring 28 goals and conceding 0.

The Second Dynasty (1921–1931)

In 1920 player and captain Necip Şahin became manager of the team, but he still played for the club. After five years without winning a title the club eventually won the league title in 1922. In the same year Necip Şahin quit as manager and Adil Giray took over as Player-manager. He could not win a title until 1924 and Ali Sami Yen decided to sign Billy Hunter who was at that time the coach of the Turkish national team.

They won the Istanbul League three consecutive times (in 1925, 1926, 1927). The 1928 championship was aborted due to the Olympic Games in Amsterdam. Hunter quit as manager in 1928 and Galatasaray legend Nihat Bekdik became player-manager and led the club to the 1929 title, as well as finishing 2nd in 1930.
Because of the Olympic Games, the club missed the chance to win the league in five consecutive years.
The star player of the 1920s was Nihat Bekdik. He played for Galatasaray for twenty years, and was captain for twelve years (1924–1936).

In 1931 the club won the Istanbul Football League for the 11th time, it was the club's sixth title in ten years/nine seasons.

Bad years (1932–1948)
After a dispute about amateurism-professionalism between Galatasaray SK members in 1933, the group which favored a more professional club left Galatasaray SK and founded the Güneş SK.
Thanks to financial and political power the new club was able to sign the best players of Galatasaray SK and the fall of Galatasaray SK begun.
Between 1932 and 1949 the club could not win the Istanbul League. In 1933 Galatasray SK won the Istanbul Shield and in 1939 the Milli Küme. Not only the football team was in a crisis however, as the whole club was in a chaotic situation.
Between 1930–1941 there had been fifteen presidents and ten managers.

Star player Nihat Bekdik quit in 1936, though a new star joined in 1934, Gündüz Kılıç. Thanks to both players the club were runners up of the Istanbul Football League in 1934–1935 and 1935–1936.
With Kiliç the club won the Istanbul Cup in 1942 and 1943 and were runners up of the Istanbul Football League in 1941–1942.

Back again (1949–1958)
In 1948 the club signed Pat Molloy and after eighteen years Galatasaray SK won the Istanbul Football League in the 1948–1949 season.
In 1952 the Istanbul Football League became a professional league ( Istanbul Professional League).
In the same year Galatasaray legend Gündüz Kılıç quit at the age of just 33 and became the club manager for the 1952–1953 season. He returned in 1954 and stayed till 1957.
During his second coaching period between 1954 and 1957 the club won the Istanbul Football League in 1954–1955 and 1955-1956.

The European Champion Clubs' Cup started in 1955–1956, but the first nationwide Turkish League started in 1959. Due to the Istanbul Football League being the strongest league in Turkey, Galatasaray SK participated at the 1956–1957 European Champion Clubs' Cup season.
Galatasaray SK lost to Dinamo București 3–1 in Bucharest, but managed to win in Istanbul 2–1. Although the club was eliminated from the competition, it was a historical participation. Galatasaray SK became the first Turkish club to play in a UEFA competition, the first Turkish club to score in a UEFA competition and the first Turkish club to win a match in a UEFA competition.
In 1957, after Kiliç quit, George Dick became manager of Galatasaray SK and the club won their fifteenth and last Istanbul Football League title in 1958.

In 1955 the club signed the 19-year-old Izmir Football League top scorer of 1954–1955 Metin Oktay, and a new era started.

Professional period

Into the National League: 1959
Türkiye Profesyonel 1. Ligi (today it is organized with the name Süper Lig) formed in 1959, just after the foundation of UEFA in 1954. This is the top-flight professional league in Turkish nationwide football, and the most popular sporting competition in the country. 
The 1959 Milli Lig (National League) was the first season of professional football in Turkey. The league was made up of sixteen clubs split into two groups: the Kırmızı Grup (Red Group) and Beyaz Grup (White Group), the colours of the Turkish flag. The first season took place in the calendar year of 1959, instead of 1958–59, because the qualifying stages took place in 1958.
The final consisted of two legs and took place between the winners of each group. Galatasaray won the Kırmızı Grup and Fenerbahçe won the Beyaz Grup. 
Galatasaray won the first match 1–0. Metin Oktay scored the goal and the ball ripped the net, but Fenerbahçe won the second 4–0, winning 4–1 on aggregate.
Metin Oktay finished top scorer with 11 goals. Although Metin Oktay became Gol Kralı in 1960 and 1961, the club could not win the league, finishing 3rd in 1960 and 2nd in 1961.

The Third Dynasty (1962–1966)
For the third time Gündüz Kılıç became manager of Galatasaray SK in 1960.
Galatasaray SK won the league in 1961–1962 and 1962-1963.
In the 1962–1963 season the club scored 105 goals, which is still a Süper Lig record, with Metin Oktay the topscorer for the 4th time.
In the same season the TFF started the Turkish Cup and Galatasaray SK won both final legs 2–1 against Fenerbahçe SK and became the first club to win the double.
Galatasaray SK could not win the Süper Lig for the next five seasons, but managed to win the Turkish Cup four times in a row, which is still a Süper Lig record. In 1964 Altay SK, in 1965 Fenerbahçe SK and in 1966 Beşiktaş JK lost the Turkish Cup final to Galatasaray SK.
In 1966 the TFF started the Turkish Super Cup. Galatasaray SK won the first Turkish Super Cup beating Süper Lig champion Beşiktaş JK 2–0 in Ankara.

After seven consecutive seasons and a total of eleven seasons Galatasaray SK manager Gündüz Kılıç quit.
His managerial record at the club included winning two Istanbul Football League championships, two Süper Lig championship titles, four Turkish Cup and one Turkish Super Cup.

The Fourth Dynasty (1969–1973)
After 5 season without winning the Süper Lig new Galatasaray president Selahattin Beyazıt signed Tomislav Kaloperović as the new manager of the club.
Galatasaray became champions and Galatasaray legend Metin Oktay ended his career winning the Gol Kralı for the sixth time, which is still a record in the Süper Lig.
After finishing eighth in 1969–1970 the club won three consecutive Süper Lig championships in 1971, 1972 and 1973. It was the first time that any club had won the Süper Lig three times in a row.

The Renaissance (1984–1992)

Derwall and Denizli era: 1984–1992
German coach Jupp Derwall (1927–2007), shocked observers by turning down several job offers in the Bundesliga in favour of accepting the manager's position at Turkish club Galatasaray. At the time, Turkish football was not well regarded in Europe, and Turkish clubs had never made any real impression on the international scene. The arrival of Derwall, an internationally respected and experienced coach, changed this perception, and his tenure at Galatasaray is often credited with having helped spark the revival in the fortunes of Turkish football. As well as winning one national championship and one Turkish Cup, Derwall's time in Istanbul also involved his introducing modern Western European training techniques and tactical ideas to the Turkish game. Therefore, he's regarded as the revolutionizer of Turkish football. Two of Turkey's most respected coaches, Fatih Terim and Mustafa Denizli, both trained under Derwall during his time in Turkey, and have been quick to praise Derwall's influence.

Derwall retired from coaching with Galatasaray in 1987; despite speculation that he might take over as manager of the Turkey national football team, he chose instead to return to Germany and enjoy his retirement.

Derwall's assistant coach Mustafa Denizli took his position after Derwall left. Denizli kept Galatasaray on the road to progress with success. It was not luck, nor coincidence, but the outcome of the years of hard work, when Galatasaray made a historic run for Turkish football and reached the semi-finals of the Champions League of 1989.

The Fifth Dynasty (1992–2002): Top of Europe

Alp Yalman era: 1990-1996
Alp Yalman was elected as the club president in 1990, a position he held for six years. Galatasaray S.K. won two league titles, two national cups, and two national super cups, while Alp Yalman was the president. He usually worked with German coaches, Karl-Heinz Feldkamp, Reiner Hollmann and Reinhard Saftig. Besides domestic success, Galatasaray drew the attention of observers after eliminating Manchester United at the UEFA Champions League knockout stage in 1993. Development in Turkish football continued, led by Galatasaray under Alp Yalman's presidency.

Süren and Terim era 1996-2000
Galatasaray's most successful era came in the late 1990s, when the club won the UEFA Cup and European Super Cup and became the first Turkish football club ever to win a European trophy. They were aided in this by one of Turkey's best generation of home grown footballers who went on to finish third at the 2002 FIFA World Cup and played in the quarter finals of UEFA Euro 2000.

Between 1996 and 2000, Galatasaray won four consecutive Turkish league titles which is a record which the club still holds. This stability of success was crowned when the club won the Turkish League title, the Turkish Cup and the UEFA Cup in the same season, 2000.

All of these successes came under the coaching of Fatih Terim and visionary club president Faruk Süren.

Fatih Terim is known as the most successful manager of Galatasaray. After he left, Galatasaray won the UEFA Super Cup in 2000. The club then reached the quarter finals of the Champions League in 2001, both under the coaching of Mircea Lucescu, though since then there haven't been any notable appearances in the higher levels of European cups.

Ups and downs 2002–2011

Canaydin era: 2002-2008
Galatasaray entered the new millennium as one of the elite football clubs in Europe. However, as the team of 1996–2000 got older, the football section was unable to replenish the team with young stars. As the success faded, the club struggled with economic problems and Galatasaray Chairman Özhan Canaydın, who was elected in 2002, was widely criticized for this failure.

In this period, the club worked on establishing projects like Galatasaray Store, Galatasaray Magazine, Galatasaray EUROPA and Galatasaray TV in order to improve the club's relationship with the fans and increase income. But the most complex project remained the building of a new stadium, which had been planned since the 1990s. Construction finally began in December 2007.

Once completed in 2009, Aslantepe will be used mostly for football matches, particularly it will host the home matches of Galatasaray. The stadium has a capacity of 52,000 people, replacing their previous stadium Ali Sami Yen Stadium.

Galatasaray became champions for the 2007–2008 season. Cevat Güler the champion manager of the squad said that this championship was no miracle but months of hard work after a season with many pitfalls.

Polat era: 2008–2011
Adnan Polat became chairman in 2008 and Michael Skibbe became manager. The club won the Turkish Super Cup after beating Kayserispor 2–1. In the 2008–2009 season, Galatasaray were eliminated from the UEFA Champions League by Steaua București, though qualified for the UEFA Cup. Galatasaray qualified to group stage after beating Bellinzona 6–4 on aggregate. Galatasaray came 2nd in Group B and were drawn against Bordeaux. The club beat the French side 4–3 on aggregate and progressed to face Hamburg. The first leg finished in a 1–1 draw but the club was eliminated from the fourth round following a 3–2 loss, despite Galatasaray leading 2–0 in the first half. Michael Skibbe was sacked after a 5–2 loss against relegation battlers Kocaelispor and was replaced with Bülent Korkmaz. Galatasaray competed with Fenerbahçe for a place in the UEFA Europa League but lost the battle despite a 2–1 win over Sivasspor, league runners up due to Fenerbahçe's 2–1 win against Trabzonspor at an away match. Galatasaray finished the league with 61 points in 5th place. Milan Baroš was their top scorer of the season.

In 2009–10 season, Frank Rijkaard became manager. Galatasaray started the season very well and won first 6 matches. But this performance was fallen remaining of the league and the club finished the season as 3rd. Galatasaray started UEFA Europa League at 2nd Preliminary Round. The club beat FC Tobol with 3-1 aggregate, Maccabi Netanya with 10-1 one and Levadia Tallinn with 6-1 one and qualified to group stage. Galatasaray finished first at Group F and faced with Atlético Madrid, eventually winners. The first leg was finished a 1–1 draw but the second one was a 2–1 loss and was eliminated from it at 3rd Round.

In 2010–11 season, Galatasaray started UEFA Europa League at 2nd Preliminary Round and beat Serbian OFK Belgrade with 7-3 aggregate but was eliminated at next round to Ukrainian Karpaty Lviv a 3-3 aggregate with an away goal rule. Galatasaray started Süper Lig bad and lost first 2 matches against Sivasspor and Bursaspor. The club won the next 4 games but Rijjkaard was sacked after losing Ankaragücü at home match with a 4–2 score and was replaced with Gheorghe Hagi. Hagi also was sacked after elimination from Turkey Cup, last chance for the club for qualifying to European Cups, by Gaziantepspor a 3-2 aggregate and losing at home match against their archrivals, Fenerbahçe with a 2–1 score after leading 1–0 score at first half at Round 26 of Süper Lig. Despite Bülent Ünder took manager position, Galatasaray dropped to 14th place at Round 28. Later this team recovered from this position and finished the league as 8th behind 36 points from Fenerbahçe, league champions. Galatasaray lived the worst season after 1981-82 one and broke losing match record for them with 16. They also made once negative average with scored 41 goals and conceded 46 ones.

The Sixth Dynasty (2011– present)

Aysal era: 2011 - 2014
May 14, 2011, Aysal replaced Adnan Polat to become the 34th President of Galatasaray, with a record of the highest majority of votes in the 106-year-history of Galatasaray, winning 2998 of the 4019 votes cast.[1] The previous record was set by outgoing Adnan Polat, who won 2944 of the 5234 votes during the chairmanship election in March 2008.
After an unsuccessful season, Galatasaray was unable to qualify for European football. After the internal conflict amongst board members in addition to the poor performance of the squad during the 10-11 season, Galatasaray appointed a new chairman Ünal Aysal. Ünal Aysal's first scoop for building a better Galatasaray squad to claim the dominance in the Süper Lig was to appoint a new manager. Ünal Aysal called up Fatih Terim his first, and the only choice, for a third time to manage Galatasaray, and the third Fatih Terim era for Galatasaray had begun.
Galatsaray SK won the 2011–2012 Süper Lig. It was the eighteenth League title for the club and Fatih Terim set a new record by winning the Süper Lig for the fifth time as a manager. It was also the first season at new home ground the Türk Telekom Arena. He managed to extend this record to six, when Galatasaray won the 2012–2013 Süper Lig.

Galatsaray SK won the treble in the 2014–15 season, winning Süper Lig, Turkish Cup and Süper Kupa. It was the sixth double for the club and the first one after 15 years.

The Imparator is back again
Despite winning the Turkish Cup in 2015–2016 for the 3rd consecutive time - the second best run at the history of the cup (Galatarsay won the cup between 1963 and 1966), the club finished the season at the 6th place. During the season the new president Dursun Aydın Özbek fired the triple winning coach of the 2014–15 season Hamza Hamzaoğlu after bad result at the 2015–16 UEFA Champions League campaign, and hired the legendary coach of the 1980s, Mustafa Denizli. The spell of Mustafa Denizli lasted till 29 February 2016 and Jan Olde Riekerink was attended as the new manager of the team till February 2017, as he was than replaced by Igor Tudor.
Despite being unbeaten in the first 10 weeks the club fired the  Igor Tudor after bad results and the legendary manager Fatih Terim took over.
Despite  changing the manager during the season the club managed to win the 2017–2018 Süper Lig.
Galatsaray SK won the treble in the 2018–19 season, winning Süper Lig, Turkish Cup and Süper Kupa. It was the seventh double for the club and the first one after 4 years.

Players
There are many successful footballers who have played for Galatasaray and made their mark on Turkish football history. Few examples may be 1930s national hero Eşfak Aykaç, Boduri who died at the age of 21, Mehmet Leblebi who scored a domestic record of fourteen goals in single match, Gündüz Kılıç nicknamed Baba (father) who was the coach but also the player of his team in the 1950s with great success on both, Bülent-Reha Eken brothers, Suat Mamat who made a hat-trick in 1954 FIFA World Cup, Coşkun Özarı a life devoted to Galatasaray, Turgay Şeren the heroic goalkeeper that called "the Panther of Berlin", Fatih Terim the team captain of Galatasaray and the Turkish National Football team for years and the current coach, Metin Oktay six time top scorer of Turkish league, Zoran Simović another skilled goalkeeper known for his penalty saves, Cüneyt Tanman who played a record of 342 games for Galatasaray, Tanju Çolak a goalscorer and European Golden Boot 1988 winner with Galatasaray, Cevad Prekazi an Albanian teammate of Tanju specializing in free kicks, Taffarel the world cup winner goalkeeper of Brazil, Gheorghe Hagi Romanian football hero that still described as the best foreign player ever to play in Turkey, and, Hakan Şükür, who scored most goals in top flight Turkish Football with 249 goals spent the majority of his career, 14 years, at Galatasaray and is also the club's most scoring player with 228 goals.

Honours

Managerial history

Presidential history

Great matches in Europe

Notes

External links 
  Official website of Galatasaray SK

Galatasaray S.K. (men's football)
Galatasaray